The forest soft-furred mouse or West African praomys (Praomys rostratus) is a species of rodent in the family Muridae.
It is found in Ivory Coast, Ghana, Guinea, and Liberia.
Its natural habitats are subtropical or tropical moist lowland forest and subtropical or tropical moist montane forest.

References

Praomys
Mammals described in 1900
Taxonomy articles created by Polbot